George Lane-Fox (4 May 1793 – 15 November 1848), of Bramham Park, Yorkshire, was a British landowner and Tory politician.

Lane-Fox was the son of James Fox-Lane, of Bramham Park, Yorkshire, by the Honourable Mary Lucy, daughter of George Pitt, 1st Baron Rivers. He was the brother of Sackville Lane-Fox and the uncle of Sackville Lane-Fox, 12th Baron Conyers, and Augustus Pitt Rivers. He inherited Bramham Park, near Wetherby but moved to Bowcliffe Hall after Bramham Hall was severely damaged by fire in 1828.

Lane-Fox was returned to parliament for Beverley in 1820, a seat he held until 1826 and again between 1837 and 1840. His brother Sackville Lane-Fox succeeded him in 1840.

Lane-Fox died in November 1848, aged 55. He had married Georgiana Henrietta, daughter of Edward Percy Buckley, of Minestead Lodge, Hampshire, in 1814. They had one son and two daughters. His only son George Lane-Fox (d. 1896), High Sheriff of Leitrim and of Yorkshire, was the grandfather of George Lane-Fox, 1st Baron Bingley.

References

External links

1793 births
1848 deaths
UK MPs 1820–1826
UK MPs 1837–1841
Tory MPs (pre-1834)
Conservative Party (UK) MPs for English constituencies
English landowners
George
19th-century British businesspeople